

Lethrinops is a genus of haplochromine cichlids endemic to Lake Malawi in East Africa. Particularly in the aquarium hobby, they are known as the sandeaters or sandsifters.

Species
There are currently 24 recognized species in this genus:
 Lethrinops albus Regan, 1922
 Lethrinops altus Trewavas, 1931
 Lethrinops argenteus C. G. E. Ahl, 1926
 Lethrinops auritus (Regan, 1922) (golden sand-eater)
 Lethrinops christyi Trewavas, 1931
 Lethrinops furcifer Trewavas, 1931 (greenface sandsifter)
 Lethrinops gossei W. E. Burgess & H. R. Axelrod, 1973
 Lethrinops leptodon Regan, 1922
 Lethrinops lethrinus (Günther, 1894)
 Lethrinops longimanus Trewavas, 1931
 Lethrinops longipinnis Eccles & D. S. C. Lewis, 1978
 Lethrinops lunaris Trewavas, 1931
 Lethrinops macracanthus Trewavas, 1931
 Lethrinops macrochir (Regan, 1922)
 Lethrinops macrophthalmus (Boulenger, 1908)
 Lethrinops marginatus C. G. E. Ahl, 1926 (Lethrinops rounded head)
 Lethrinops micrentodon (Regan, 1922)
 Lethrinops microdon Eccles & D. S. C. Lewis, 1977
 Lethrinops microstoma Trewavas, 1931 (littletooth sandeater)
 Lethrinops mylodon Eccles & D. S. C. Lewis, 1979
 Lethrinops oculatus Trewavas, 1931
 Lethrinops parvidens Trewavas, 1931 (Lethrinops red flush)
 Lethrinops stridei Eccles & D. S. C. Lewis, 1977
 Lethrinops turneri Ngatunga & Snoeks, 2003

References

External links
 Eccles, David H. and Lewis, Digby S.C. 1977. A taxonomic study of the Genus Lethrinops Regan (Pisces: Cichlidae) from Lake Malawi: part 1. Ichthyological Bulletin of the J.L.B. Smith Institute of Ichthyology; No. 36. J.L.B. Smith Institute of Ichthyology, Rhodes University, Grahamstown, South Africa.
 Eccles, David H. and Lewis, Digby S.C. 1978. A taxonomic study of the Genus Lethrinops Regan (Pisces: Cichlidae) from Lake Malawi: part 2. Ichthyological Bulletin of the J.L.B. Smith Institute of Ichthyology; No. 37. J.L.B. Smith Institute of Ichthyology, Rhodes University, Grahamstown, South Africa.
 Eccles, David H. and Lewis, Digby S.C. 1979. A taxonomic study of the Genus Lethrinops Regan (Pisces: Cichlidae) from Lake Malawi: part 3. Ichthyological Bulletin of the J.L.B. Smith Institute of Ichthyology; No. 38. J.L.B. Smith Institute of Ichthyology, Rhodes University, Grahamstown, South Africa.

 
Cichlid genera

Taxa named by Charles Tate Regan
Taxonomy articles created by Polbot